Shakespeare Santa Cruz was an annual professional theatre festival in Santa Cruz, California, which ran from 1981 to 2013. After losing the financial support of the University of California, Santa Cruz, the company was relaunched through crowdfunding as Santa Cruz Shakespeare.

History 
Shakespeare Santa Cruz was founded in 1981 and performed annually on the campus of the University of California, Santa Cruz. Plays by Shakespeare and other great dramatists were performed indoors on the UCSC Theater Arts Mainstage and outdoors in the Sinsheimer-Stanley Festival Glen. Bringing in professional actors, directors and designers from throughout the country, the Company's season ran from July to early September and presented three or four plays that ran concurrently in repertory six days a week (no performance on Mondays). With a mission to “cultivate the imagination, wit, daring, and vision that the greatest playwrights demand of artists and audiences alike," SSC sought to present a festival of theatre which showcased contemporary approaches to directing, designing and acting. It eschewed "museum Shakespeare." Attendance grew from 7,716 people in 1982 to 31,013 in 1992. Since its founding, the company's artistic directors have been Audrey Stanley (1982–86), Michael Edwards (1987–92), Danny Scheie (1993–95), Risa Brainin, Paul Whitworth (1996–2007), and Marco Barricelli (2008–2013). Some of the rising theatre stars who have worked at SSC are: David Aaron Baker, Bryan Cranston, Maria Dizzia, Colman Domingo, Dan Donohue, Caitlin FitzGerald, Richard Gunn, Peter Jacobson, Carrie Preston, Reg Rogers, and Michael Stuhlbarg.

In 1997, Artistic Director Paul Whitworth introduced the SSC annual Winter Holiday season. In keeping with the tradition of Shakespeare Santa Cruz’s fresh take on the classics, the holiday shows were original musicals written for SSC by playwright Kate Hawley with music composed by Gregg Coffin, Craig Bohmler and Adam Wernick.  A fusion of the traditions of the British pantomime and the American musical, Cinderella, Gretel and Hansel, The Princess and the Pea and Sleeping Beauty were based on traditional fairy tales and appeal to audiences of all ages.  The winter season performed in November and December.

In addition to the summer repertory season and the holiday show, Shakespeare Santa Cruz had two performance programs which sought to engage student actors with Shakespearean and other classical texts---the summer Fringe show and the Shakespeare to Go program. The Fringe show was an opportunity for the summer Company's acting interns to perform their own production in the Glen two nights each summer. Past productions included Lysistrata, The Antipodes, Fools in the Forest, and The Mock-Tempest. Shakespeare to Go was an educational engagement program—and recipient of National Endowment for the Arts (NEA) funding—featuring University of California Santa Cruz Theater Arts students who toured local schools in the spring performing one-hour versions of one of the full-length plays to be featured in the summer repertory season. Additionally, Shakespeare to Go presented a limited number of free public performances.

The festival was responsible for supporting itself, but had recently run deficits which were paid by the University of California. In 2008, with California's budget crisis having resulted in reduced funding, the university could no longer afford to cover these debts. An agreement was reached that if the theater could raise $300,000, it could continue operation. Within 10 days of the agreement's announcement, over $400,000 was raised. Claiming continuing financial problems, however, the UCSC Arts Division dean announced several years later that Shakespeare Santa Cruz would end after its 2013 holiday production.

Following this announcement, the theater company began a campaign to raise money to become an independent company. By February 2014, they raised over $1 million (USD) through crowdfunding to continue on without the financial support of the university.  In March 2014, the new company changed its name to Santa Cruz Shakespeare.

Season history

 1981
 The Taming of the Shrew
 1982
 A Midsummer Night's Dream
 1983
 The Merry Wives of Windsor
 Macbeth
 1984
 Henry IV, Part 1
 The Tempest
 1985
 As You Like It
 Hamlet
 Rosencrantz and Guildenstern Are Dead (by Tom Stoppard)
 1986
 Twelfth Night
 King Richard II
 A Life in the Theatre (by David Mamet)
 1987
 Much Ado About Nothing
 King Henry V
 Company (by Stephen Sondheim and George Furth)
 1988
 The Comedy of Errors
 Julius Caesar
 Antony and Cleopatra
 Titus Andronicus
 1989
 Love's Labour's Lost
 Romeo and Juliet
 Once in a Lifetime (by George S. Kaufman & Moss Hart)
 1990
 The Winter's Tale
 Othello
 Amadeus (by Peter Shaffer)
 1991
 A Midsummer Night's Dream
 Measure for Measure
 Waiting for Godot (by Samuel Beckett)
 Our Town (by Thornton Wilder)
 1992
 The Taming of the Shrew
 Macbeth
 A Doll's House (by Henrik Ibsen)
 1993
 The Comedy of Errors
 All's Well That Ends Well
 Doctor Faustus (by Christopher Marlowe)
 Damn Yankees (by Douglass Wallop, George Abbott, Richard Adler, and Jerry Ross)
 1994
 The Merchant of Venice
 The Merry Wives of Windsor
 The Rape of Tamar (by Tirso de Molina)
 1995
 The Tempest
 King Lear
 The Dresser (by Ronald Harwood)
 1996
 Twelfth Night
 Pericles
 Tartuffe (by Molière)
 1997
 As You Like It
 King Richard III
 The Forest (by Aleksandr Ostrovsky)
 The Wind in the Willows (by Kenneth Grahame)
 1998
 Much Ado About Nothing
 Othello
 The Marriage of Figaro (by Pierre Beaumarchais)
 The Wind in the Willows (by Kenneth Grahame)
 1999
 Romeo and Juliet
 The Two Gentlemen of Verona
 Arms and the Man (by George Bernard Shaw)
 Cinderella (by Kate Hawley & Gregg Coffin)
 2000
 Cymbeline
 Love's Labour's Lost
 Kean (by Jean-Paul Sartre)
 Cinderella (by Kate Hawley & Gregg Coffin)
 2001
 A Midsummer Night's Dream
 Macbeth 
 She Stoops to Conquer (by Oliver Goldsmith)
 Gretel and Hansel (by Kate Hawley)
 2002
 Coriolanus
 The Merry Wives of Windsor
 The Sea Gull (by Anton Chekhov)
 Gretel and Hansel (by Kate Hawley)
 2003
 The Comedy of Errors 
 Hamlet 
 Private Lives (by Noël Coward)
 The Emperor's New Clothes (by Brad Caroll)
 2004
 The Taming of the Shrew 
 The Tamer Tamed (by John Fletcher)
 Who's Afraid of Virginia Woolf? (by Edward Albee)
 Lysistrata (by Aristophanes)
 The Princess and the Pea (by Kate Hawley)
 2005
 Twelfth Night
 The Winter's Tale
 Engaged (by W. S. Gilbert)
 Cinderella (by Kate Hawley & Gregg Coffin)
 2006
 As You Like It
 King Lear
 Pygmalion (by George Bernard Shaw)
 Sleeping Beauty (by Kate Hawley)
 2007 
 Much Ado About Nothing
 The Tempest
 The Playboy of the Western World (by J. M. Synge)
 Endgame (by Samuel Beckett)
 The Princess and the Pea (by Kate Hawley)
 2008
 All's Well That Ends Well
 Romeo and Juliet
 Bach at Leipzig (by Itamar Moses)
 Burn This (by Lanford Wilson)
 The Wind in the Willows (by Kenneth Grahame)
2009
 A Midsummer Night's Dream
 Julius Caesar
 Shipwrecked! An Entertainment (by Donald Margulies)
2010
 The Lion in Winter (by James Goldman)
 Love's Labour's Lost
 Othello
 Fringe Show: La Ronde (by Arthur Schnitzler)
2011
 The Comedy of Errors
 The Three Musketeers (adapted from Alexandre Dumas)
 Henry IV, Part 1
 Fringe Show: Double Bind (Plautus's Menaechmi)
 Bard Babes (by Robin Goodrin Nordli)
 A Year with Frog and Toad (by Willie Reale & Robert Reale)
2012
 Twelfth Night
 The Man in the Iron Mask (world premiere by Scott Wentworth)
 Henry IV, Part 2
 Fringe Show: The Mandrake (by Niccolò Machiavelli, translated by Wallace Shawn)
 In Acting Shakespeare (written by James DeVita)
 Honk! (by Anthony Drewe and George Stiles)
2013 
 The Taming of the Shrew
 Henry V
 Fringe Show: Tom Jones (by Henry Fielding)
 Shakespeare Unscripted
 It’s a Wonderful Life, A Live Radio Show (by Joe Landry)

References

External links 
 
 Finding aid for the Shakespeare Santa Cruz Records

Shakespeare festivals in the United States
Tourist attractions in Santa Cruz County, California
1981 establishments in California
University of California, Santa Cruz
Theatre company production histories